Ran Min (died 352), also known as Shi Min (石閔), posthumously honored by the Former Yan as Heavenly King Wudao of (Ran) Wei ((冉)魏武悼天王), courtesy name Yongzeng (永曾), nickname Jinu (棘奴), was a military leader during the era of Sixteen Kingdoms in China and the only emperor of the short-lived state Ran Wei (冉魏). He was known for committing the genocide of the Jie people after usurping the Later Zhao.

Family background 
Ran Min's father Ran Liang (冉良), who later changed his name to Ran Zhan (冉瞻), was from Wei Commandery (魏郡, roughly modern Anyang, Northern Henan) and was a descendant of an aristocratic family, but one who must have, in the serious famines circa 310, joined a group of refugees led by Chen Wu (陳午).  When Later Zhao's founder Shi Le defeated Chen in 311, he captured the 11-year-old Ran Zhan as well, and for reasons unknown, he had his nephew Shi Hu adopt Ran Zhan as his son and change his name accordingly to Shi Zhan.  Ran Min's mother was named Wang (王).  It is not known when he was born, but he would have been known as Shi Min.

A Shi Zhan was mentioned to have died in battle when Shi Hu was defeated by Han Zhao's emperor Liu Yao in 328, but it is not clear whether this Shi Zhan was Shi Min's father.

During Shi Hu's reign 
In the Book of Jin, Shi Min was described as over 1.9 meters tall and possessed unusual physical strength. As Shi Min grew in age, Shi Hu became impressed by his bravery in battle and battlefield tactics, and he treated Shi Min as his own son.  The first mention in history of him as a general was in 338, when Shi Hu unsuccessfully tried to destroy the rival state Former Yan but saw his army collapse after sieging the Former Yan capital Jicheng (棘城, in modern Jinzhou, Liaoning) for about 20 days but failing to capture it.  The only army group that remained intact was the one commanded by Shi Min.

During the remainder of Shi Hu's reign, Shi Min was often referred to as a general he turned out to be.  For example, in 339, when the Jin general Yu Liang considered launching a major campaign against Later Zhao, Shi Hu chose to react, and he had his general Kui An command five generals, one of whom was Shi Min, to attack Jin's northern regions.  (Shi Min's later ally Li Nong was one of the other generals, while Shi Hu's son Shi Jian the Prince of Yiyang was another.)  Shi Min was successful in his task, and the five generals together inflicted heavy damages, thwarting Yu's plans.  For his accomplishments, Shi Min was created the Duke of Wuxing.

During the confusion after Shi Hu's death 
After Shi Hu's death in 349, his youngest son and crown prince Shi Shi became emperor, but the government was controlled by Shi Shi's mother Empress Dowager Liu and the official Zhang Chai. Shi Shi's older brother Shi Zun, the Prince of Pengcheng, was unhappy about the situation, and a number of generals who were unimpressed with Empress Dowager Liu and Zhang, including Shi Min, suggested that he march to the capital Yecheng and overthrow them.  Shi Zun did so – and also promised to create Shi Min crown prince if they were victorious. In summer 349, Shi Zun defeated Shi Shi's forces and deposed and killed him, along with Empress Dowager Liu and Zhang Chai.  Shi Zun claimed the imperial title. However, he did not appoint Shi Min crown prince as promised, but rather appointed another nephew Shi Yan (石衍) crown prince. Further, while he gave Shi Min important posts, he did not allow him to have control of the government, as Shi Min wished. Shi Min became disgruntled.

In winter 349, in fear of Shi Min, Shi Zun summoned a meeting of the princes before his mother, Empress Dowager Zheng, announcing that he would execute Shi Min. Empress Dowager Zheng opposed, reasoning that Shi Min's contributions during the coup against Shi Shi had to be remembered. Shi Zun hesitated, and meanwhile, Shi Jian, one of the princes attending the meeting, quickly reported the news to Shi Min, who acted quickly and surrounded the palace, capturing and executing Shi Zun, Empress Dowager Zheng, Shi Zun's wife Empress Zhang, Shi Yan, and several key officials loyal to Shi Zun. He made Shi Jian emperor, but he and Li Nong seized the control of the government.

Shi Jian could not endure Shi Min's hold on power, and he sent his brother Shi Bao, the Prince of Leping, and the generals Li Song (李松) and Zhang Cai (張才) against Shi Min, but after they were defeated Shi Jian pretended as if they had acted independently and executed them all. Another brother of his, Shi Zhi the Prince of Xinxing, then rose in the old capital Xiangguo (襄國, in modern Xintai, Hebei), in alliance with the Qiang chieftain Yao Yizhong and the Di chieftain Pu Hong against Shi Min and Li Nong. Shi Jian then tried to have the general Sun Fudu (孫伏都), a fellow ethnic Jie, attack Shi Min, but Shi Min quickly defeated him, and Shi Jian, trying to absolve himself, then ordered Shi Min to execute Sun. Shi Min, however, began to realize that Shi Jian was behind Sun's attack, and he decided that he needed to disarm the Jie people, who knew that he was not a Jie but ethnically Chinese. He ordered that all non-Chinese not be allowed to carry arms, and most non-Chinese fled Yecheng after that. Shi Min put Shi Jian under house arrest with no outside communication.

As the non-Chinese tribes continued fleeing Yecheng, Shi Min realized that he would not be able to use the Hu (胡 Barbarians), so he issued an order to the ethnic Chinese according to which each civil servant who killed one Hu (胡) and brought his head to him would be promoted in rank by three degrees, and a military officer would be transferred to the service at his Supreme Command. Shi Min himself led Chinese in killing the Hu (胡) people without regard for sex or age; during the day tens of thousands of heads were severed. In total over 200 thousand people were killed; their bodies were dumped outside the city. Troop commanders in various parts of the state received a rescript from Shi Min to kill the Hus (胡); as a result half of the people with high noses and bushy beards were killed. Among the 200,000 people who died in the massacre many were in fact ethnic Chinese who had high big noses, deep-set eyes and thick full beards, which in combination were considered to be the indicators of non-Hanness.

In 350, Shi Jian, still the nominal head of the state, changed the name of his state from Zhao to Wei (衛) and the imperial clan name from Shi to Li (李), under pressure from Shi Min. Many key officials fled to Shi Zhi. Local generals throughout the empire effectively became independent, waiting for the conflict to be resolved. As Shi Min's troops were busy against Shi Zhi's, Shi Jian made one final attempt against Shi Min, ordering general Zhang Shen (張沈) to attack the capital after Shi Min had left it. However, Shi Jian's eunuchs reported that to Shi Min and Li Nong, and they quickly returned to Yecheng and executed Shi Jian, also killing 38 of Shi Hu's grandsons and the rest of the Shi clan. Shi Min, restoring his father's original family name of Ran (冉), then took the throne as the emperor of a new state, Wei (魏, note different character from the state name declared previously).

As emperor of Ran Wei 

Ran Min honored his mother Lady Wang with a title of empress dowager.  He appointed his wife Lady Dong an empress, and his oldest son Ran Zhi a crown prince.  His other sons and his ally Li Nong were made princes, Li Nong's sons were given titles of dukes.  He proclaimed a general amnesty, hoping to have the generals who became independent abide by his edicts, but few of them accepted, though most Han generals outwardly did not defy him either. For unknown reasons, he soon killed Li.  He sent a letter to Emperor Mu of Jin's court with a mixed message, appearing to invite Jin to send forces north and agreeing to submit, but the letter could also be read as a defiant challenge. Jin did not react, although it began to also seek allegiance of the generals in the former territory of Later Zhao southern provinces.

Ran Min's brief reign was characterized by rash decisions and massive executions.  He would often react violently to advisors who suggested ideas different from his own, including killing them, and then regret those violent reactions after he realized that he was wrong.

In spring 351, Ran Min set a siege of the Shi Zhi's capital Xiangguo. Shi Zhi sought aid from Former Yan's prince Murong Jun and was able to deal Ran a major defeat.  At this time, the Xiongnu soldiers in Yecheng rebelled, captured his son Ran Yin, and surrendered to Shi Zhi, who executed Ran Yin.  Ran Min was thought to be dead, but when he appeared in Yecheng, the city was calmed.  Shi Zhi had his general Liu Xian besiege Yecheng, but Ran Min defeated Liu in battle and awed him so much that Liu agreed that once he returned to Xiangguo, he would kill Shi Zhi and surrender.  He did so and sent Shi Zhi's head to Ran Min, and Ran Min had Shi Zhi's head burned on a busy street in Yecheng.  Later Zhao was at its final end.

However, wars continued.  Liu Xian, after briefly submitting to Ran Min, proclaimed himself emperor.  The western provinces were taken over by Fu Jiàn, who established Former Qin.  The southern provinces largely switched their allegiance to Jin.  Meanwhile, Former Yan, which had already captured Youzhou (modern Beijing, Tianjin, and northern Hebei) and moved its capital to Jicheng (modern Beijing), continued to advance south.  Ran Min, having captured Xiangguo in early 352 and executed Liu Xian, decided to head north  to face Former Yan's army, against the advice of several officials who felt that his army needed a rest.  Former Yan's general Murong Ke, Murong Jun's brother, pretended to lose several skirmishes and then retreat, tricking Ran Min and his Chinese infantry into the open field, and then used his elite Xianbei cavalry to surround Ran Min's infantry, inflicting great losses. Ran Min himself wielded two weapons, one in each hand, and fought fiercely, inflicting many casualties on the Xianbei soldiers. However Ran Min's famous horse Zhu Long ("Red Dragon") suddenly died, and he fell off and was captured. Former Yan's forces delivered him to Murong Jun, and he insulted Murong Jun.  Murong Jun had him whipped 300 times and then executed, although was soon fearful that his spirit was causing a drought, and therefore honored him with the posthumous name Daowu.  Ran Min's wife Empress Dong and her son Ran Zhi would hold out for several more months, but eventually surrendered later that year, ending Ran Wei's brief existence.

Ran Min is now mostly known for his order to execute all of the Wu Hu, particularly the Jie. Then he fought with Hu armies in Jizhou and led several millions of migrants of different races to flee; on the way they attacked each other and only 2-3/10 people were able to go back to their homelands.  The North however soon again fell under control of the Xianbei.

Personal information 
 Father
 Ran Zhan (冉瞻), later adopted by Shi Hu and name changed to Shi Zhan (石瞻), likely died 327 in battle against Han Zhao, posthumously honored as Emperor Gao
 Mother
 Empress Dowager Wang
 Wife
 Empress Dong
 Children
 Ran Zhi (冉智), the Crown Prince (created 350), later created the Marquess of Haibin by Former Yan
 Ran Yin (冉胤), Prince of Taiyuan (created prince 350, killed by Later Zhao emperor Shi Zhi 351)
 Ran Ming (冉明), Prince of Pengcheng (created prince 350)
 Ran Yu (冉裕), Prince of Wuxing (created prince 350)
 Ran Cao (冉操)

See also
Jie (ethnic group)
Wu Hu
List of past Chinese ethnic groups
Later Zhao
Shi Hu
Genocide
Former Yan

References 

350 establishments
352 disestablishments
Later Zhao generals
Ran Wei
Sixteen Kingdoms emperors
Founding monarchs
4th-century births
352 deaths
4th-century Chinese monarchs
People executed by Former Yan
Executed Sixteen Kingdoms people
People executed by a Sixteen Kingdoms state by decapitation
4th-century executions
Murdered Chinese emperors
Genocide perpetrators
Executed monarchs